Rockwall-Heath High School is a school located in Heath, Texas, USA, and is one of two high schools that serve the Rockwall Independent School District, the other being Rockwall High School. The school enrolls students from 9th to 12th grade. It is a Texas Recognized School.

The school opened in 2005 and completed its second phase of construction in 2010 that included a new fine arts wing, a band hall and a 1500-seat auditorium, and Wilkerson-Sanders stadium. Approved and signed in 2007 during the RISD bond election, it is the most expensive bond in the history of RISD at $198 million. The school bond also includes two new schools (Celia Hays Elementary School and Sharon Shannon Elementary School), planning for a third high school, and the conversion of Utley Freshman Center into a middle school.

The first class to graduate from Rockwall-Heath High School was the class of 2008.

Athletics
The baseball team has reached the playoffs with five appearances including three trips the Regional Finals and a number one national ranking in 2010. The baseball team has won two state titles, its first being the 4A State Championship on June 8, 2012 beating Cleburne High School 10–1, and their second being the 6A State Championship on June 12, 2021 beating Keller High School 4-3.

Since the 
On November 6, 2008, the undefeated Rockwall-Heath High School Varsity football team beat Highland Park High School and claimed the 10-4A district championship title. The team won its first round of playoffs against Frisco Centennial High School and against Hillcrest High School at the Texas Stadium on November 21. The team advanced to the fourth round of playoffs, still undefeated, by beating Ennis High School. Rockwall-Heath was defeated in the quarterfinals by Sulphur Springs. The final record for the 2008 season was 13–1.

Following their first playoff season, The Hawks returned to the post season and were eliminated by Frisco Liberty High School marking a 7–4 season. The 2011 Hawks claimed a spot in the postseason making it their third trip to the playoffs in school history.

In January 2019, Rockwall-Heath had hired historic Texas high school football coach, Mike Spradlin. In his first season, the Hawks finished 5-5. 

In the 2020-2021 season, the Rockwall-Heath Varsity football team had seen a 10-4 record. Which would be ended following a 27-24 loss to Cedar Hill in the State Quarterfinals. 

In the 2021-2022 season, Heath experienced its best regular season record in recent years, finishing 10-1. The Hawks would go on to face Tomball High School in the Regional Final and lose 35-21. 

In December 2021, Football Coach Mike Spradlin announced he would be retiring at the end of the 2022 school year. In January 2022, Rockwall-Heath announced that its assistant head coach, John Harrell, would become the next football coach for the Hawks.

In January 2023, 8 Rockwall-Heath students were hospitalized during an offseason football workout in which players were forced to complete 400 push-ups in a 60-minute period without access to water. Head Coach John Harrell was placed on administrative leave following the incident.

Notable people

Alumni
 DeShon Elliott, professional football player.
 Tyler Ivey, professional baseball player. 
 Canaan Smith-Njigba, professional baseball player.
 Jake Thompson, professional baseball player.
 Drew VerHagen, professional baseball player.
 Jett Williams, professional baseball player.

References

External links
 
 Official Site of Rockwall Heath Hawks Football
 Rockwall Independent School District home page
 RHHS Marching Band

Schools in Rockwall County, Texas
Public high schools in Texas
Educational institutions established in 2005
International Baccalaureate schools in Texas
2005 establishments in Texas